Rampage is a wooden roller coaster located at Alabama Splash Adventure in Bessemer, Alabama. Manufactured and built by Custom Coasters International, with design from Larry Bill, the roller coaster original opened with the inter-municipal cooperative owned Vision Land amusement park on May 23, 1998. Rampage continued to operate until 2002, closing for the entire season due to the principle owners filing for bankruptcy. The roller coaster reopened on May 26, 2003, under the Southland Entertainment Group ownership, until its second closure in 2012 under General Attractions. Rampage sat dormant for four years, before being renovated in 2014 by owners Dan and Natalie Koch; later reopening for the 2015 season. 

Constructed at the cost of $4.3 million dollars, the design of Rampage was inspired by another CCI-built roller coaster, Megafobia, located at Oakwood Theme Park. Rampage features 9 crossovers throughout its twister layout, with trains built by Philadelphia Toboggan Coasters. Upon its initial opening, the roller coaster received mostly positives reviews from critics and guests.

History

Development and construction 
Larry Longford, then-mayor of Fairfield, Alabama, presented the idea of building an amusement park near the Birmingham, Alabama area in August 1995, with the backing of around a dozen cities. The proposed park would be named "Vision Land" and be the foremost supported project with inter-municipal cooperation. In addition, the park would incorporate several attractions within its opening year, which includes roller coasters. The Alabama Legislature approved of the park's construction in March 1996, with ground breaking for the park taking place in April. Plans for the roller coaster's construction were being arranged near the end of November, having an estimated cost of $5 million dollars and include a  drop. The roller coaster was originally to be themed to the area's historical mining operations with the attraction based on a mine cart set loose. 

A bond for the park's construction was actualized in March 1997, with Langford revealing the roller coaster would be built from wood and serve as the park's focal point attraction. Custom Coasters International (CCI) officials were present on the construction site in June to mark trees for preservation or demolition. Some concrete footings for Rampage were in place by September, with further footings being poured; the supporting structure for the station was also in construction. Finalizing engineering plans for the roller coaster were projected to be complete in October, in addition to vertical construction of the wooden supports to be completed during November. The roller coaster would celebrate its topping out ceremony on December 2 and construction was reported by the Birmingham Post-Herald to be "more than half done" during the first week of December. 

Vision Land representatives held a "Name That Coaster contest" to choose a title for its roller coaster, the name "Rampage" selected as the winner on December 15, 1997, out of 1,400 entries. The Rampage moniker was submitted by local Pleasant Grove High School student, with "Scorpion's Tail" and "Jaguar" coming in second and third place, respectively. Construction of Rampage was completed on March 22, 1998, with initial testing rehearsals conducted on March 24, using bagged oats acting as test dummies. The last checks on the roller coaster's track were conducted in early April. A preview was held on May 16, and opened coinciding with the opening of Vision Land on May 23. Rampage was one of seven wooden roller coasters to open in the United States during the 1998 season.

Operation 
After an initial successful financial year, the park continued to observe stagnant attendance into 2000. The resulting insufficient attendance, operational decisions, and debt led the park to file for Chapter 9 bankruptcy on June 4, 2002. The filing allowed the park to open its water park attractions, but left Rampage closed among other attractions through the 2002 season. After several amusement groups looked at buying the park and participants of the inter-municipal cooperation backed out, the park was sold to Team Pro Parks, a California-based venture. The venture, operating under Southland Entertainment Group, refurbished the idle Rampage roller coaster for its reopening season. Rampage was renovated by John Hinde Enterprises and opened on May 26, 2003, in the Magic Adventure (later named as Alabama Adventure) portion of Vision Land.

Vision Land was sold to General Attractions in January 2012. New ownership detailed in April the park that included Rampage would close indefinitely, with the water park portion to open in the newly named "Splash Adventure". The roller coaster was planned to be sold to fund future water park developments. Rampage sat dormant until the park was bought by the Dan and Natalie Koch, formerly of Holiday World, on March 13, 2014. As part of a five-year plan, the Kochs' planned to renovate the roller coaster to open with the park in the 2015 season. Over the period of six months, the Rampage was refurbished at the cost of $1 million dollars. The renovation saw the replacement of wooden structure and track, in addition to a new train. The renovation also included a new lift chain and control system. A preview was held for an American Coaster Enthusiasts (ACE) event on October 25. The ride re-opened to the public in 2015, with the Alabama Splash Adventure park.

Ride experience
After leaving the station, the train dips to the right before ascending the  chain lift hill. Cresting the lift hill, the train enters a left turn pre-drop before descending the 52-degree,  drop. At the bottom of the drop, the train banks slightly left and completes a camelback hill before ascending into a left-banked hill. Continuing the turn, the train dips, before flattening into a drop where the train completes a hill, then rises to the right into a continuous right banked turn. Continuing the turn, the train dips, slightly ascends, then exits into drop where it completes another hill. The train ascends a right banked turn, dropping to complete a hill, where it ascends into a left banked turn. Continuing the left banked turn with a series of dips, the train drops and banks right before going upwards into the final brake run. The train makes a slight left, before dropping to the right into one final hill before descending into the station. One cycle of the roller coaster took about a minute and thirty seconds to complete.

Characteristics
Rampage was manufactured and built by Custom Coasters International, and designed by Larry Bill. Rampage was the 23rd project built by CCI. The roller coaster was assembled with southern yellow pine. The roller coaster's layout is largely based on Megafobia at Oakwood Theme Park in Pembrokeshire, United Kingdom, which was also built by CCI. Park officials chose the wooden roller coaster type for Rampage because of its older-style and cost; which was built for US$4.3 million dollars. When it opened, the roller coaster was located within the Celebration City section of the park.

Rampage is considered a twister roller coaster because the track's layout weaves through itself. The roller coaster features 9 crossovers and 12 curves. When it opened, the roller coaster operated with two Philadelphia Toboggan Coasters (PTC) trains. Each train had six cars that contain two rows of two seats, allowing a maximum capacity of 24 people. Each set contains a lap bar restraint system as well as a seat belt.

Reception 
Upon its initial opening, Rampage received generally positive reviews from critics and guests. Steve Joynt, writing for the Birmingham Post-Herald, commented that Rampage was "the undisputed star of the show" out of Vision Land's opening attractions, and favorably commented on the initial drop. Joynt further commented on the roller coaster's fast pacing, head chopper moments, and resonance of the overall ride experience as "the cars truly roar down the hills". Writing for The Anniston Star, Jeff Amy described Rampage as having "delivered on the promise" of enjoyment foretold by the roller coaster's operator, delivering "an adrenaline-induced tingle". Amy remarked that although Rampage was a "fine coaster", it could not compare to the roller coaster lineup at theme park chains such as Six Flags.

Staff of The Birmingham News recorded an ACE member's reaction to Rampage, who stated the roller coaster had promising air time, speed, and height. Then-ACE president, Jan Kiser, was quoted by Joynt as having ascertained positive reviews about Rampage from members because of the roller coaster's defining features. Tim O'Brien of the amusement park trade magazine, Amusement Business, inducted Rampage as his 3rd best wooden coaster and the 5th best overall coaster; citing the roller coaster's hills, drops, and location as factors in his placement.

Awards

See also
 2011 in amusement parks
 Excalibur (Funtown Splashtown USA), another CCI-built wooden roller coaster
 Shivering Timbers, another CCI-built wooden roller coaster

References

External links 

 

Roller coasters in Alabama